Mohamed Salah Jedidi (17 March 1938 – 17 March 2014) was a Tunisian footballer who played as a striker.

Career
Born in Ghardimaou, Jedidi played club football in Tunisia for Club Africain and AS Mégrine.

He played for Tunisia between 1962 and 1968.

References

1938 births
2014 deaths
People from Jendouba Governorate
Tunisian footballers
Association football forwards
Club Africain players
AS Mégrine players
Tunisian Ligue Professionnelle 1 players
Tunisia international footballers
1962 African Cup of Nations players
Competitors at the 1963 Mediterranean Games
1965 African Cup of Nations players
Mediterranean Games competitors for Tunisia